Brown's Hotel is a luxury hotel in Mayfair, London, established in 1837 and owned by Rocco Forte Hotels since 3 July 2003.  It is considered one of London's oldest existing hotels.

History
Brown's Hotel was founded in 1837, by James and Sarah Brown. The architecture of the eleven Georgian townhouses which make up its premises means that each room is distinctly different from another. In 1889, the hotel was unified with the neighbouring St George's Hotel, as they backed onto each other and were eventually merged to allow for a throughway between Dover Street and Albemarle Street.

Historian John Lothrop Motley stayed at the hotel in 1874, as shown in a letter he wrote on 17 June that year, to Dutch historian Groen van Prinsterer. Celebrated Victorian writers Oscar Wilde, Arthur Conan Doyle, Robert Louis Stevenson, JM Barrie and Bram Stoker were also all regular visitors. The hotel was the location of the first successful telephone call in Europe, made by Alexander Graham Bell on a phone which can be seen in the hotel today.  The hotel has also hosted Theodore Roosevelt; Napoleon III; Empress Eugenie; Elizabeth, Queen of the Belgians; Haile Selassie I of Ethiopia; George II, King of the Hellenes; Cecil Rhodes; Rudyard Kipling; Agatha Christie; and Stephen King. While Brown's has been described as the inspiration for Christie's At Bertram's Hotel, the Oxford Dictionary of National Biography says Christie's model was a different Mayfair hotel, Fleming's.

The hotel came under the management of Rocco Forte Hotels on 3 July 2003, having once been operated by Raffles International Hotels. During 2004–2005, the hotel underwent a £24 million refurbishment and re-opened in December 2005.

Interior
Brown's Hotel is noted for its traditional English Victorian sophistication fused with a contemporary feel. The bedrooms were redesigned by Olga Polizzi and combine modern features with traditional furnishing, and are all individually decorated. The Kipling Suite is the hotel's largest, known as the setting for Rudyard Kipling's stays and some of his subsequent writings.

The hotel has several restaurants and bars. Charlie's (formerly HIX Mayfair and Beck at Brown's) is an à la carte restaurant which serves seasonal British cuisine with contemporary European influence.  The Drawing Room, at the front of the hotel, has served afternoon tea and light snacks since the mid-nineteenth century; it features fine wood-panelling and Paul Smith décor.  The Donovan Bar is named after the British photographer Terence Donovan and is lined with over 50 black and white prints of his photographs. The hotel also has a gymnasium and spa treatment rooms.

References

External links
Rocco Forte Hotels website
History of Brown's Hotel with Photos by cosmopolis.ch

Buildings and structures in Mayfair
Hotels in the City of Westminster
Hotel buildings completed in 1837
Hotels established in 1837